A. H. G. Mohiuddin is a Bangladeshi businessman, diplomat, and former Permanent Representative of Bangladesh to the United Nations.

Career 
Mohiuddin was the Consulate General of Bangladesh in Hong Kong from 1 August 1980 to 30 November 1982.

In 1987, Mohiuddin was the Deputy Permanent Representative of Bangladesh to the United Nations in New York City.

On 29 June 1990, Mohiuddin was appointed the Permanent Representative of Bangladesh to the United Nations.

Mohiuddin served as the Director of Economic Affairs at the Organization of Islamic Conferences.

Mohiuddin is the chairperson of the Board of Directors of Grameen Bitek. He is the representative of  Al-Rajhi Company for Industry and Trade in the Board of Islami Bank Bangladesh Limited.

Personal life 

Mohiuddin is the brother in law of Hussain Muhammad Ershad, President of Bangladesh.

Mohiuddin was rescinding in Westchester County while serving as the Deputy Permanent Representative of Bangladesh to the United Nations in New York City. His domestic maid, Amina, accused him and his wife of holding her prisoner in their home in Westchester County and beating her.

References 

Bangladeshi diplomats
Permanent Representatives of Bangladesh to the United Nations
Living people
Year of birth missing (living people)